Dayushu Town is a town in the Yanqing District of Beijing. It borders Baiquan Subdistrict, Yanqing and Shenjiaying Towns to the north, Jingzhuang Town to the east, Badaling Town to the south, and Kangzhuang Town to the west. In the year 2020, it had a population of 16,166.

The name Dayushu comes from a large elm tree that used to exist within the region during the Ming dynasty.

Geography 
Dayushu Town is located on the foothill of Yan Mountain Range. Datong–Qinhuangdao railway, National Highway 110 and Beijing–Ürümqi Expressway traverse through the town.

History

Administrative divisions 
At the time of writing, Dayushu Town consists of 26 subdivisions, including these 1 communities and 25 villages:

See also 

 List of township-level divisions of Beijing

References

Yanqing District
Towns in Beijing